The 2015 Colonial Athletic Association football season was the ninth season of football for the Colonial Athletic Association (CAA) and part of the 2015 NCAA Division I FCS football season.

Previous season

New Hampshire won the CAA Championship with an 8–0 record in conference play.  They were joined in the FCS Playoffs by James Madison, Richmond, and Villanova.  James Madison would fall in the First Round to Liberty.  New Hampshire would earn the #1 seed and beat Fordham and #8 seed Chattanooga before falling to #5 seed Illinois State in the Semifinals.  Richmond would defeat Morgan State in the First Round before falling to #7 seed Coastal Carolina in the Second Round.  Villanova would receive the #6 seed and beat Liberty before falling to Sam Houston State in the Quarterfinals.

Head coaches

Records are from before start of 2015 season

Preseason poll results
First place votes in parentheses

Rankings

Regular season

All times Eastern time.

Rankings reflect that of the STATS FCS poll for that week.

Week One

Players of the week:

Week Two

Players of the week:

Week Three

Players of the week:

Week Four

Players of the week:

Week Five

Players of the week:

Week Six

Players of the week:

Week Seven

Players of the week:

Week Eight

Players of the week:

Week Nine

Players of the week:

Week Ten

Players of the week:

Week Eleven

Players of the week:

Week Twelve

Players of the week:

FCS Playoffs

Postseason Awards
Coach of the Year – Danny Rocco (Richmond)
Offensive Player of the Year – Vad Lee, SR, QB (James Madison)
Co-Defensive Players of the Year – DeAndre Houston-Carson, SR, S (William & Mary); Victor Ochi, SR, DL (Stony Brook)
Special Teams Player of the Year – DeVonte Dedmon, SO, RS/WR (William & Mary)
Co-Offensive Rookies of the Year – Zach Bednarczyk, QB (Villanova); Thomas Jefferson, RB (Delaware)
Co-Defensive Rookies of the Year – Julian Cox, LB (Albany); Chris Tedder, LB (Towson)
Chuck Boone Leadership Award – Jake Prus, JR, OL (Villanova)

All–Conference Teams

Records against other conferences

CAA vs. FCS conferences

CAA vs. FBS conferences

Attendance

References